Tumanbay is a historical fantasy radio drama. The story is set in Tumanbay, the capital of a fictional empire, and involves political intrigue. Both a supernatural force and political unrest threaten the city. The setting is inspired by the Mamluk slave dynasty of Egypt.

Broadcast
The first ten episodes of Tumanbay were first broadcast in the UK on BBC Radio 4 between December 2015 and February 2016. A second series, consisting of eight episodes, was broadcast between April and June 2017. In September 2017, in a deal between BBC and Panoply Media, the first two series were made available to international audiences on the Panoply network. Transmission of a third series of eight episodes, began on 4 February 2019 on BBC Radio 4. The first episode of the fourth series, was broadcast on BBC Radio 4 on 25 May 2020.

Characters

Gregor
Gregor (Rufus Wright) is Head of the Palace Guard and one of Sultan Al-Ghuri's inner circle of advisors. His duties include espionage and counterespionage, and his methods are at once subtle and brutal. Gregor's childhood was spent as a slave in the far reaches of the Empire alongside his brother, Qulan, now Commander of the Imperial Army. The brothers were bought out of poverty by their master and trained in the arts of diplomacy and combat. At court, Gregor must contend with the rivalry of his nemesis, the Vizier Cadali, and with the vicissitudes of serving a cruel and fickle Sultan.

Heaven
Heaven (Olivia Popica) is 14. Her desire to see the world and take her place in it is tempered only by her reluctance to be married off in order to do so. As spring in Tumanbay is short-lived and soon gives way to the heat of summer, so must its children grow up fast. Heaven leaves behind the land of her childhood and sets sail with her mother Ila for Tumanbay, where the girl's father Ibn, a successful slave trader, is preparing her wedding. But fate, it seems, has other plans for Heaven, plans that will test her ability to survive and force her to become a woman.

Cadali
Cadali (Matthew Marsh) is the Vizier and the Sultan's chief advisor. Cadali's loyalties are to himself, to his Sultan and to Tumanbay, in that order. He possesses a finely-tuned sense of self-preservation coupled with a cunning and strategic mind. He trusts no one and demonstrates the ability to appear about the palace wherever he is least expected or wanted. Cadali also has an overwhelming fondness for sugar plums.

Sultan Al-Ghuri
Sultan Al-Ghuri (Raad Rawi) came to power following the untimely death of his brother, the previous Sultan. Having taken his brother's first wife Shajar as his own, he dotes on her son, his nephew Madu. Al-Ghuri's other foible is his love of perfume. Yet he wears the burden of office heavily, obsessively aware of the ever-present threat of assassination and of the fragility of the dynastic line.

Shajar
Shajar (Sarah Beck Mather) is Sultan Al-Ghuri's First Wife, and as such, head of the palace harem. Her son, Madu, is the only issue from her previous marriage to the former Sultan, Al-Ghuri's predecessor and brother. Shajar grew up in poverty and soon learnt to exploit her dazzling beauty in exchange for power and wealth. But Shajar understands that beauty is ephemeral and that she must fight to preserve her position and to safeguard her own future and that of her son.

Sarah
Sarah (Nina Yndis) was captured and brought to Tumanbay along with her baby as a slave. The beautiful Sarah arouses admiration and curiosity amongst all who encounter her. Her striking blue eyes and pale skin, along with her enigmatic and sophisticated bearing belie her status as a slave. She is appointed servant to Shajar, the First Wife, following the death of the previous maid.

Head Eunuch
The Head Eunuch (John Sessions) is playful, yet ruthless. He has the plum position of deciding what is bought for the palace and what isn't. He recognises that the slave-girl, Sarah, is something different in Tumanbay.

Shamsi
Shamsi (Laure Stockley) is a prostitute who serves the Palace. She beguiles men. Yet she is constantly afraid, fearful of her own fate.

Slave
Like many sold into servitude in Tumanbay, the man known only as Slave (Akin Gazi) comes from noble origins in a country swallowed up by the empire in its hunger for land and resources. An involuntary companion of Heaven after he kidnaps her, he resents having to play bodyguard to a girl he sees as pampered and privileged.

Boy
Boy (Darwin Brokenbro) is in the service of Rajik and Pamira in the moving town. The Boy has the ability to command dogs and other animals. He is fascinated by Heaven's beauty and driven by the desire for family.

Wolf
Wolf (Alexander Siddig) is the leader of a proudly independent band of warrior-horsemen from the austere mountains sworn to the service of Qulan. Wolf's appetite for love matches his lust for war.

Daniel
Daniel (Gareth Kennerley) an enslaved soldier. Daniel is a slave sold to the palace. The sultan decides to put Madu (Danny Ashok) into the army to help him "learn to be a man." He arrives thinking he's going to be an officer in charge of things; that it's going to be more of the privileged lifestyle, but instead he is handed down to the slave infantry soldiers to "toughen him up." It's a total shock to his system. He really struggles to survive. He is saved by Daniel, and their relationship becomes a strong bond of friendship and then eventually love.

Episodes

Series 1 (2015-2016)
Season 1 premiered online in the United Kingdom on 2 December 2015.

Series 2 (2017)
Season 2 premiered online in the United Kingdom on 25 April 2017.

Series 3 (2019)
Season 3 premiered online in the United Kingdom on 4 February 2019.

Series 4 (2020) 
Season 4 premiered online in the United Kingdom on 25 May 2020.

Reception
The first season of the podcast was well received. June Thomas in Slate called it the "Best podcast of the year". Because of its medieval setting, large cast of characters, and themes of political intrigue, the podcast was often compared with the HBO TV series, Game of Thrones.

References

Audio podcasts
2015 podcast debuts
Historical fiction podcasts
Fantasy podcasts